In enzymology, a dihydrofolate synthase is an enzyme that catalyzes the chemical reaction

ATP + 7,8-dihydropteroate + L-glutamate  ADP + phosphate + 7,8-dihydropteroylglutamate

The 3 substrates of this enzyme are ATP, 7,8-dihydropteroate, and L-glutamate, whereas its 3 products are ADP, phosphate, and 7,8-dihydropteroylglutamate.

This enzyme belongs to the family of ligases, specifically those forming carbon-nitrogen bonds as acid-D-amino-acid ligases (peptide synthases).  The systematic name of this enzyme class is 7,8-dihydropteroate:L-glutamate ligase (ADP-forming). Other names in common use include dihydrofolate synthetase, 7,8-dihydrofolate synthetase, H2-folate synthetase, 7,8-dihydropteroate:L-glutamate ligase (ADP), dihydrofolate synthetase-folylpolyglutamate synthetase, folylpoly-(gamma-glutamate) synthetase-dihydrofolate synthase, FHFS, FHFS/FPGS, dihydropteroate:L-glutamate ligase (ADP-forming), and DHFS.  This enzyme participates in folate biosynthesis.

Structural studies

References

 
 
 
 
 

EC 6.3.2
Enzymes of known structure